Baeoentedon is a genus of hymenopteran insects of the family Eulophidae, they are parasitoids of whitefly from the family Aleyrodidae which are found on trees of the genus Ficus. They have been recorded from Australia, China, India, Indonesia and Florida.  A fifth species, Baeoentodon farazi, was described from Karnataka, India, in 2017.

References

External links
Key to Nearctic eulophid genera
Universal Chalcidoidea Database

Eulophidae
Hymenoptera genera
Taxa named by Alexandre Arsène Girault